Michael Lee Amesbury (born 7 May 1969) is a British politician serving as Member of Parliament (MP) for Weaver Vale since 2017. A member of the Labour Party, he was Shadow Minister for Local Government until 2022. He previously served as Shadow Minister for Employment from 2018 to 2020 and Shadow Minister for Housing from 2020 to 2021.

Education
Amesbury was born on 7 May 1969 in Wythenshawe, Manchester. He was educated at Ilkley College and the University of Central England.

Career
A careers advisor by trade, Amesbury previously worked as a manager with the Connexions careers advice service. He also worked as Senior Parliamentary Advisor to Shadow Education Secretary Angela Rayner and as political advisor and stakeholder manager on Andy Burnham's successful campaign to become Mayor of Greater Manchester. He was a director of City South Manchester Housing Trust, an award-winning social enterprise providing affordable housing in the Fallowfield, Hulme, Moss Side and Whalley Range areas of south Manchester. He also served as a policy advisor to Tameside Council.

Political career
Amesbury joined the Labour Party as a 17-year-old after moving with his family to Yorkshire, where he says he was politicised by the impact on local families of Margaret Thatcher's political policies and the subsequent miners' strike.

He served as a Regional Officer and Fundraising and Events Manager for Labour and was later elected to the party's National Policy Forum (NPF)—the policy making arm of The Labour Party.

Amesbury was elected to Manchester City Council representing Fallowfield Ward in 2006, defeating the incumbent Liberal Democrat, and subsequently winning re-election in 2010 and 2014. Rising to the position of Executive Member for Culture and Leisure from 2008 to 2012, he helped bring the National Football Museum to the city. He stood down following his election to the House of Commons, triggering a by-election in his ward in July 2017.

Amesbury gained the Weaver Vale constituency from the Conservative incumbent Graham Evans in the 2017 general election on a swing of 4.3%. He was named Parliamentary Private Secretary in the Shadow Department for Work and Pensions team in January 2018, and in July of the same year was promoted to Shadow Employment Minister.

He is a member of the UNISON and GMB trade unions. He campaigned for 'remain' in the 2016 EU membership referendum.

In 2019, Amesbury apologised for having shared an antisemitic caricature on Facebook in 2013, stating “I apologise unreservedly for this terrible error. I genuinely don’t recall sharing this image and I’m mortified that I did so. This appalling image image contains an antisemitic caricature and a reference to the ‘illuminati’ conspiracy theory. I would never have intentionally shared antisemitic tropes and I am sincerely sorry that I did.”

Amesbury was appointed as the Shadow Minister for Housing and Planning in the April 2020 reshuffle following Keir Starmer's election as Labour leader. In the subsequent May 2021 reshuffle, his brief was reduced to the Shadow Minister for Housing, with Ruth Cadbury receiving the planning portfolio.

In March 2020, Amesbury put forward a Private member's bill on education for a second reading. The Bill is seeking to reduce the cost of school uniforms. In April 2021, the bill became law after it made it through final reading in the House of Lords and received Royal assent the following day.

In 2020, Amesbury became one of four vice-chairs of the All Party Parliamentary Group on Whistleblowing which has been subject to criticism by some campaigners on whistleblowing law reform.

Personal life
Amesbury is married and has a young son. He is a Manchester United fan and his interests include rugby league and indie music.

Notes

References

External links

Living people
Labour Party (UK) MPs for English constituencies
UK MPs 2017–2019
Labour Party (UK) councillors
Councillors in Manchester
People educated at Castleford Academy
Alumni of the University of Bradford
Alumni of Birmingham City University
UK MPs 2019–present
People from Wythenshawe
1969 births